is Haruomi Hosono's fifth solo album. Initially intended as a collaboration with illustrator Tadanori Yokoo, who traveled to India alongside Hosono (as part of a group) for inspiration; Yokoo ended up only drawing the cover, having contracted a stomach illness and suffering from diarrhea during the trip, rendering this as a Hosono solo album.

Cochin Moon was conceptually written as the soundtrack of a non-existent Bollywood film, a trait inspired by the artists' trip. The album includes performances by Tin Pan Alley keyboardist Hiroshi Satō, Yellow Magic Orchestra member Ryuichi Sakamoto, and Hideki Matsutake. Despite being Hosono's first completely electronic solo album (at the time YMO's debut was still being recorded, making this Hosono's first electronic album to be released), the exotica feel of Hosono's previous solo work is still present.

Track listing

Personnel
 Haruomi Hosono/"Shuka Nishihara" – synthesizers, production
 Hiroshi Satō & Ryuichi Sakamoto – keyboards
 Hideki Matsutake – computer programming
 Seiichi Chiba & Kunio Tsukamoto – engineering
 Humio Ozawa – assistant engineering
 Mitsuo Koike – reissue mastering

References

External links 
 

1978 albums
Haruomi Hosono albums